Parliamentary elections were held in QwaQwa between 19 and 21 April 1980. The Dikwankwetla Party won all 20 of the elected seats.

Electoral system
The Legislative Assembly had a total of 60 seats, 20 of which were elected and 40 of which were reserved for tribal representatives; 26 from the Koena tribe and 14 from the Tlokwa tribe.

Results

References

QwaQwa
Elections in South African bantustans
QwaQwa
April 1980 events in Africa